The Squeezing Hand (La mano que aprieta) is a 1953 Argentine crime comedy film directed by Enrique Carreras. It was adapted for the screen by Domingo Di Núbila from a Julio Porter and  Raúl Gurruchaga play. It stars  Gogó Andreu, Tono Andreu, Alfredo Barbieri and Amelia Vargas and premiered on 21 January 1953.

Plot
Three relatives of a millionaire plot to kill her in order to inherit her fortune, but a quirky doctor who happens to be a detective interferes.

Cast
  Gogó Andreu		
  Tono Andreu		
  Alfredo Barbieri		
  Mario Baroffio		
  Tito Climent		
  María del Río		
  Ángel Eleta		
  Inés Fernández	as Lola
  Don Pelele		
  Hugo Pimentel		
  Roberto Real		
  Semillita as Martín
  Amelia Vargas

Reception
El Heraldo del Cinematografista stated: "It is regrettable that the intrigue, not very original but with many possibilities, suspenseful, was not given more prominence in the concern of constantly achieving realistic effects, particularly in charge of Alfredo Barbieri." On the other hand, the critic Manuel Rey (known as King) said: "It achieves...its purpose of making people laugh."

References

External links
 

1953 films
1950s Spanish-language films
Argentine black-and-white films
Argentine crime comedy films
1953 comedy films
1950s Argentine films
Films directed by Enrique Carreras
1950s crime comedy films